Boninagrion ezoin is a species of damselfly in the family Coenagrionidae. It is endemic to Japan.

Sources
 

Insects of Japan
Coenagrionidae
Insects described in 1952
Taxonomy articles created by Polbot
Taxobox binomials not recognized by IUCN